Mesohalobacter is a Gram-negative and non-motile genus of bacteria from the family of Flavobacteriaceae with one known species (Mesohalobacter halotolerans).

References

Flavobacteria
Bacteria genera
Monotypic bacteria genera
Taxa described in 2020